Gladsaxe SF is an ice hockey team in Gladsaxe, Denmark. They play in the Danish Division 1, the second level of ice hockey in Denmark.

History
The club was founded in 1959. They won the AL-Bank Ligaen five times in the 1960s and 1970s, and the Danish Division 1 twice in 1987, and 1996.

Achievements
AL-Bank Ligaen
 Champion (5) : 1967, 1968, 1971, 1974 et 1975
Runner-up (4) :  1966, 1969, 1970 et 1977
Danish Division 1 (2) :  1996,  1987

References

Ice hockey teams in Denmark
Gladsaxe Municipality
Ice hockey clubs established in 1959
1959 establishments in Denmark